The Bueno-Orovio–Cherry–Fenton model, also simply called Bueno-Orovio model, is a minimal ionic model for human ventricular cells. It belongs to the category of phenomenological models, because of its characteristic of describing the electrophysiological behaviour of cardiac muscle cells without taking into account in a detailed way the underlying physiology and the specific mechanisms occurring inside the cells.

This mathematical model reproduces both single cell and important tissue-level properties, accounting for physiological action potential development and conduction velocity estimations. 
It also provides specific parameters choices, derived from parameter-fitting algorithms of the MATLAB Optimization Toolbox, for the modeling of epicardial, endocardial and myd-myocardial tissues. 
In this way it is possible to match the action potential morphologies, observed from experimental data, in the three different regions of the human ventricles.
The Bueno-Orovio–Cherry–Fenton model is also able to describe reentrant and spiral wave dynamics, which occurs for instance during tachycardia or other types of arrhythmias.

From the mathematical perspective, it consists of a system of four differential equations. One PDE, similar to the monodomain model, for an adimensional version of the transmembrane potential, and three ODEs that define the evolution of the so called gating variables, i.e. probability density functions whose aim is to model the fraction of open ion channels across a cell membrane.

Mathematical modeling

The system of four differential equations reads as follows:

 

The adimensional transmembrane potential  can be rescaled in mV by means of the affine transformation . ,  and  refer to gating variables, where in particular  can be also used as an indication of intracellular calcium  concentration (given in the adimensional range [0, 1] instead of molar concentration).

 

 

 

Different parameters sets, as shown in Table 1, can be used to reproduce the action potential development of epicardial, endocardial and mid-myocardial human ventricular cells. There are some constants of the model, which are not located in Table 1, that can be deduced with the following formulas:

 

 

 

 

 

 

 

In order to trigger the action potential development in a certain position of the domain , a forcing term , which represents an externally applied density current, is usually added at the right hand side of the PDE and acts for a short time interval only.

Weak formulation
Assume that  refers to the vector containing all the gating variables, i.e. , and  contains the corresponding three right hand sides of the ionic model. The Bueno-Orovio–Cherry–Fenton model can be rewritten in the compact form:

 

Let  and  be two generic test functions.

To obtain the weak formulation:
multiply by  the first equation of the model and by  the equations for the evolution of the gating variables. Integrating both members of all the equations in the domain :

perform an integration by parts of the diffusive term of the first monodomain-like equation:

 

Finally the weak formulation reads: 

Numerical discretization
There are several methods to discretize in space this system of equations, such as the finite element method (FEM) or isogeometric analysis (IGA).

Time discretization can be performed in several ways as well, such as using a backward differentiation formula (BDF) of order  or a Runge–Kutta method (RK).

Space discretization with FEM
Let  be a tessellation of the computational domain  by means of a certain type of elements (such as tetrahedrons or hexahedra), with  representing a chosen measure of the size of a single element . 

 

The space discretized version of the first equation can be rewritten as a system of non-linear ODEs by setting  and :

 

where ,  and
.

The non-linear term  can be treated in different ways, such as using state variable interpolation (SVI) or ionic currents interpolation (ICI).

 

The equations for the three gating variables, which are ODEs, are directly solved in all the degrees of freedom (DOF) of the tessellation  separately, leading to the following semidiscrete form:

Time discretization with BDF (implicit scheme)
With reference to the time interval , let  be the chosen time step, with  number of subintervals. A uniform partition in time  is finally obtained.

At this stage, the full discretization of the Bueno-Orovio ionic model can be performed both in a monolithic and segregated fashion.
With respect to the first methodology (the monolithic one), at time , the full problem is entirely solved in one step in order to get  by means of either Newton method or Fixed-point iterations:

 

If a segregated method is employed, the equation for the evolution in time of the transmembrane potential and the ones of the gating variables are numerically solved separately:

Firstly,  is calculated, using an extrapolation at previous timesteps  for the transmembrane potential at the right hand side:

Secondly,  is computed, exploiting the value of  that has just been calculated:

See also
Monodomain model
Bidomain model

References

Mathematical modeling
Numerical analysis
Cardiac electrophysiology